The 1947–48 BAA season was the Warriors' 2nd season in the BAA (which later became the NBA).

BAA Draft

Roster

Regular season

Season standings

Record vs. opponents

Game log

Playoffs

|- align="center" bgcolor="#ffcccc"
| 1
| March 23
| @ St. Louis
| L 58–60
| Joe Fulks (18)
| Howie Dallmar (3)
| St. Louis Arena
| 0–1
|- align="center" bgcolor="#ccffcc"
| 2
| March 25
| @ St. Louis
| W 65–64
| George Senesky (20)
| Howie Dallmar (2)
| St. Louis Arena
| 1–1
|- align="center" bgcolor="#ccffcc"
| 3
| March 27
| St. Louis
| W 84–56
| Joe Fulks (30)
| Howie Dallmar (5)
| Philadelphia Arena
| 2–1
|- align="center" bgcolor="#ffcccc"
| 4
| March 30
| St. Louis
| L 51–56
| Joe Fulks (21)
| Howie Dallmar (2)
| Philadelphia Arena
| 2–2
|- align="center" bgcolor="#ffcccc"
| 5
| April 1
| @ St. Louis
| L 62–69
| Joe Fulks (17)
| Howie Dallmar (2)
| St. Louis Arena
| 2–3
|- align="center" bgcolor="#ccffcc"
| 6
| April 3
| St. Louis
| W 84–61
| Joe Fulks (23)
| Howie Dallmar (5)
| Philadelphia Arena
| 3–3
|- align="center" bgcolor="#ccffcc"
| 7
| April 6
| @ St. Louis
| W 85–46
| Joe Fulks (15)
| Chink Crossin (4)
| St. Louis Arena
| 4–3
|-

|- align="center" bgcolor="#ccffcc"
| 1
| April 10
| Baltimore
| W 71–60
| Chick Halbert (19)
| Howie Dallmar (3)
| Philadelphia Arena7,201
| 1–0
|- align="center" bgcolor="#ffcccc"
| 2
| April 13
| Baltimore
| L 63–66
| Joe Fulks (27)
| Dallmar, Musi (2)
| Philadelphia Arena6,982
| 1–1
|- align="center" bgcolor="#ffcccc"
| 3
| April 15
| @ Baltimore
| L 70–72
| Joe Fulks (21)
| Kaplowitz, Dallmar (2)
| Baltimore Coliseum4,500
| 1–2
|- align="center" bgcolor="#ffcccc"
| 4
| April 17
| @ Baltimore
| L 75–78
| Joe Fulks (29)
| Howie Dallmar (3)
| Baltimore Coliseum4,500
| 1–3
|- align="center" bgcolor="#ccffcc"
| 5
| April 20
| Baltimore
| W 91–82
| Joe Fulks (19)
| Howie Dallmar (4)
| Philadelphia Arena6,012
| 2–3
|- align="center" bgcolor="#ffcccc"
| 6
| April 21
| @ Baltimore
| L 73–88
| Joe Fulks (28)
| Howie Dallmar (2)
| Baltimore Coliseum4,500
| 2–4
|-

Transactions

Purchases

Sales

Awards and records
 Joe Fulks, All-NBA First Team
 Howie Dallmar, All-NBA First Team

References

Golden State Warriors seasons
Philadelphia